The Green Party/Comhaontas Glas is the fourth-largest political party in the Oireachtas.

The party has twelve TDs, four Senators, two MEPs, two MLAs and fifty six members of local government (forty eight in the Republic of Ireland and eight in Northern Ireland).

2020–present

2019–2020

2016–2019

2012–2016

2007–2011

2002–2007

See also
Fianna Fáil Front Bench
Fine Gael Front Bench
Labour Party Front Bench
Sinn Féin Front Bench

References

Front Bench
Front benches in the Oireachtas